Videostream was an application that streamed video, music, and image files wirelessly to Google's Chromecast. It was originally a Google Chrome application, until Google disclosed the end of support of the Chrome App Store. As of February 2021, the app has been downsized to a tab within Google Chrome, which does not allow drag-and-drop. Several other features were also been removed.

Stating that it's the simplest and most reliable way to stream videos to your Chromecast, in one click, it will take any local video file and play it wirelessly onto any Chromecast. Under the hood, Videostream transcodes the audio and video of incompatible files into a format supported by Chromecast. The product received favorable reviews from the sites: Engadget, Lifehacker and Tekzilla. all of which praised the software's ease of use and its ability to handle multiple video formats.

Technology 
The app makes use of several open-source libraries including the FFmpeg project.

Major Features

Video Casting 
Videostream currently supports over 400 different audio and video codecs with multiple quality settings to allow playback under various network conditions, Videostream often fails to cast to Chromecast if you are protected by the AVG and Avast internet virus software.

Mobile File Browsing 
In a major update in February 2015, a media library was added to the application allowing file browsing from a mobile device.

Monetization 
Videostream is free of charge and free of advertisements. A premium upgrade is offered which adds several non-standard features. but it's notably unreliable and the app developers do not provide support for the premium version.

References 

Google Chrome apps